is a railway station on the Joban Line in the city of Iwaki, Fukushima Prefecture, Japan, operated by East Japan Railway Company (JR East).

Lines

Station layout
Uchigō Station has two opposed side platforms connected to the station building by a footbridge. The station is staffed.

Platforms

History
It was renamed Uchigō Station on 20 December 1956. The station was absorbed into the JR East network upon the privatization of the Japanese National Railways (JNR) on 1 April 1987. A new station building was completed in November 2014.

Passenger statistics
In fiscal 2018, the station was used by an average of 1017 passengers daily (boarding passengers only).

Surrounding area
 Shiramizu Amidadō
 Ruins of the Mirokuzawa coal mine
 Uchigō Post Office

See also
 List of railway stations in Japan

External links

References

Railway stations in Japan opened in 1898
Railway stations in Fukushima Prefecture
Jōban Line
Railway stations in Japan opened in 1897
Iwaki, Fukushima